Ordinary Love may refer to:

 "Ordinary Love" (Paris Bennett song), on the album Princess P
 "Ordinary Love" (Shane Minor song), on the album Shane Minor
 "Ordinary Love" (U2 song), in the film Mandela: Long Walk to Freedom
 Ordinary Love (2019 film), a British romantic drama